Events from the year 1886 in France.

Incumbents
President: Jules Grévy 
President of the Council of Ministers: 
 until 7 January: Henri Brisson
 7 January-16 December: Charles de Freycinet
 starting 16 December: René Goblet

Events
 15 May – Portugal and France agree to regulate the borders of their colonies in Guinea.

Arts and literature
 30 November – Folies Bergère in Paris stages its first revue.
 Georges Seurat finishes painting A Sunday Afternoon on the Island of La Grande Jatte.

Births

January to June
 28 January – Georges Painvin, cryptanalyst (died 1980)
 5 March – Léon Mathot, actor and film director (died 1968)
 7 March – Jacques Majorelle, painter (died 1962)
 7 March – René Thomas, motor racing driver (died 1975)
 28 March – Gustave Mesny, army general (died 1945)
 29 March – Paul Amiot, actor (died 1979)
 15 April – Amédée Ozenfant, cubist painter (died 1966)
 19 April – Hermine David, painter (died 1970)
 25 April – Marie Brémont, supercentenarian, the oldest recognized person in the world from November 2000 until her death (died 2001)
 29 April – Count Renaud de la Frégeolière, author and first president of the Fédération Internationale de Bobsleigh et de Tobogganing (died 1981)
 3 May – Marcel Dupré, organist, pianist and composer (died 1971)
 24 May – Paul Paray, conductor, organist and composer (died 1979)

July to December
 16 July – Pierre Benoit, novelist (died 1962)
 3 August – Henri Debain, actor (died 1983)
 8 September – Marguerite Jeanne Carpentier, painter and sculptor (died 1965)
 15 September – Paul Lévy, mathematician (died 1971)
 16 September – Jean Arp, sculptor, painter, poet and abstract artist (died 1966)
 30 September – Gaston Ramon, veterinarian and biologist (died 1963)
 3 October – Alain-Fournier, author and soldier (died 1914)
 4 October – Laurent Eynac, politician and Minister (died 1970)
 6 November – André Marty, leading figure in the French Communist Party (died 1956)
 15 November – René Guénon, orientalist and philosopher (died 1951)
 30 December – Henri Chapron, automobile coachbuilder (died 1978)

Full date unknown
 Marie-Gabriel Tissot, Abbot of Quarr (died 1983)

Deaths
 23 January – Jean Baptiste Prosper Bressant, actor (born 1815)
 27 April – Eugène Isabey, painter, draftsman, and printmaker (born 1803)
 17 March – Pierre-Jules Hetzel, editor and publisher (born 1814)
 23 May – Pierre Édouard Frère, painter (born 1819)
 12 July – Ferdinand Berthier, deaf educator, intellectual and political organiser (born 1803)
 14 August – Edmond Laguerre, mathematician (born 1834)
 8 September – Maurice Jean Auguste Girard, entomologist (born 1822)
 16 September – Louis, duc de Decazes, statesman (born 1819)
 26 September – Hippolyte Castille, writer (born 1820)
 14 November – Alexandre-Emile Béguyer de Chancourtois, geologist and mineralogist (born 1820)

References

1880s in France